Burakovo is a rural locality (a village) in Niginskoye Rural Settlement, Nikolsky District, Vologda Oblast, Russia. The population was 6 as of 2002.

Geography 
Burakovo is located 22 km northwest of Nikolsk (the district's administrative centre) by road. Petryanino is the nearest rural locality.

References 

Rural localities in Nikolsky District, Vologda Oblast